Barry Castle is a small Grade II* listed ruined two-storey gatehouse with the adjacent walls of a hall located in the Romilly district of Barry, Vale of Glamorgan in south Wales.

See also
 List of castles in Wales
 Castles in Great Britain and Ireland

References

Buildings and structures in Barry, Vale of Glamorgan
Castles in the Vale of Glamorgan
De Barry family
Castle ruins in Wales
Country houses in Wales
Grade II* listed buildings in the Vale of Glamorgan
Grade II* listed castles in Wales
Gatehouses (architecture)